The Latvian women's national under-16 and under-17 basketball team is a national basketball team of Latvia and is governed by the Latvia Basketball Association. 
It represents the country in international under-16 and under-17 (under age 16 and under age 17) women's basketball competitions.

World Championship Results

See also
Latvia women's national basketball team
Latvia women's national under-19 basketball team
Latvia men's national under-17 basketball team

References

Basketball in Latvia
Basketball teams in Latvia
Women's national under-17 basketball teams